Viktor Alekseyevich Myagkov (born 2 February 1985) is a Russian former professional footballer.

Club career
He made his debut in the Russian Premier League in 2005 for FC Shinnik Yaroslavl.

References

1985 births
Footballers from Yaroslavl
Living people
Russian footballers
Russia under-21 international footballers
Association football forwards
FC Shinnik Yaroslavl players
FC Tekstilshchik Ivanovo players
FC Dynamo Barnaul players
FC Akzhayik players
Russian Premier League players
Kazakhstan Premier League players
Russian expatriate footballers
Expatriate footballers in Kazakhstan
FC Sheksna Cherepovets players